Anderson Drew Ferguson IV (born November 15, 1966) is an American politician who is the U.S. representative for . The district stretches from the southern suburbs of Atlanta to the northern suburbs of Columbus, including a sliver of Columbus itself.

A Republican, Ferguson previously served as the mayor of West Point, Georgia, a city between LaGrange and Columbus.

Early life and education 
Ferguson was born in Langdale, Alabama, in 1966 and graduated from the University of Georgia and the Medical College of Georgia.

Career prior to Congress 
Ferguson was a dentist with a family dental practice. He served as an alderman for West Point, Georgia, and then as mayor from 2008 to 2016. He resigned in 2016 to focus on his race for the House of Representatives.

U.S. House of Representatives

Elections

2016 
In 2016, Ferguson ran for the Georgia third district seat being vacated by Republican incumbent Lynn Westmoreland. He placed in the top two in the May Republican primary and faced State Senator Mike Crane in the runoff. The two had finished within 100 votes of each other; both had about 27% of the vote.

In the runoff, Ferguson had the support of business-oriented Republicans, including Westmoreland. The primary and its runoff were expensive and bitterly contested; Super PACs and other groups outside Georgia spent more than $2 million on the race.

On July 26, Ferguson defeated Crane with 54% of the vote. In the November general election, Ferguson defeated Democratic nominee Angela Pendley with 68% of the vote.

2018 
In the May 2018 Republican primary, Ferguson faced Philip Singleton of Sharpsburg, a former Army helicopter pilot; Ferguson won with 74% of the vote.

In November, Ferguson defeated Democratic nominee Chuck Enderlin with 66% of the vote.

Tenure
Ferguson was sworn into office on January 3, 2017.

In November 2018, after he won reelection, Ferguson was appointed chief deputy whip for the House Republican conference by House Majority Whip Steve Scalise. This post is historically a stepping stone to higher posts. For example, House Majority Leader Eric Cantor and House Speakers Dennis Hastert and Kevin McCarthy once served as chief deputy whip.

On May 19, 2021, Ferguson and the other seven Republican House leaders in the 117th Congress voted against establishing a national commission to investigate the 2021 United States Capitol attack. Thirty-five House Republicans and all 217 Democrats present voted to establish the commission.

Committee assignments
Committee on Ways and Means
Subcommittee on Social Security
Subcommittee on Select Revenue Measures

Caucus memberships
 U.S.-Japan Caucus
Republican Study Committee

Political positions 
Running for election in 2016, Ferguson's main issues were securing the borders, destroying the Islamic State, strengthening the military, replacing the income tax with a flat tax, repealing Obamacare, and supporting a constitutional amendment for congressional term limits. He signed on to the lawsuit seeking to overturn the result of the 2020 election, one of four Georgian representatives to do so. The Supreme Court dismissed the suit on December 11, 2020.

Texas v. Pennsylvania
In December 2020, Ferguson was one of 126 Republican members of the House of Representatives to sign an amicus brief in support of Texas v. Pennsylvania, a lawsuit filed at the United States Supreme Court contesting the results of the 2020 presidential election, in which Joe Biden defeated incumbent Donald Trump. The Supreme Court declined to hear the case on the basis that Texas lacked standing under Article III of the Constitution to challenge the results of an election held by another state.

Abortion 

Ferguson has sponsored legislation prohibiting abortion, including  No Taxpayer Funding for Abortion and Abortion Insurance Full Disclosure Act,  Born-Alive Abortion Survivors Protection Act,  Pain-Capable Unborn Child Protection Act,  Sanctity of Human Life Act, and  Defund Planned Parenthood Act of 2019.

LGBT rights
In 2021, Ferguson voted against , the Equality Act,  which would prohibit discrimination on the basis of sex, sexual orientation and gender identity.

In response to a 2016 American Family Association survey, Ferguson indicated on a Likert scale question that he agrees with the statement "Governments should define marriage as between one man and one woman; no other definition of marriage should be legalized or supported with public funds."

Controversy

In February 2019, a representative from the American Federation of Government Employees sought an apology from Ferguson for a biography of Robert E. Lee that was on display in Ferguson's office. The AFGE representative reported that the book displayed a page that detailed Lee's pro-slavery beliefs. Ferguson's spokeswoman relayed an apology, and said the book had been removed from display.

Electoral history

Personal life
Ferguson is married to his wife, Julie Ferguson. They have six children.

References

External links
Congressman Drew Ferguson
Campaign website
House Vote History
 

 

|-

|-

1966 births
21st-century American politicians
American dentists
Living people
Mayors of places in Georgia (U.S. state)
People from West Point, Georgia
Republican Party members of the United States House of Representatives from Georgia (U.S. state)
University of Georgia alumni